Anan is both a given name and a surname. 

Anan (Hebrew: עָנַן ‘ānan) is used as both a Hebrew or Arabic name meaning "cloud, vapour" or descriptive "visible water vapour floating above the earth". The Arabic form is from Classical Arabic, possibly adopted from the Hebrew, but with the spelling (Arabic: عَنَان ‘anān) since the proper term of "cloud" in Arabic is saḥāb (سَحَاب).

Notable people with the Hebrew name include:

 Anan, one of the Israelites who sealed the covenant after the return from Babylon
 Anan (amora), Babylonian Jewish scholar
 Anan ben David, Karaite
 Saul ben Anan, Karaite Jewish leader of the eighth century CE

Notable people with the Arabic name include:

Anan Anwar, Thai singer and actor
Sami Hafez Anan, Chief of Staff of the Egyptian Armed Forces

Other notable people who are not related to the Hebrew-Arabic meaning of name but carries the name or surname:

Chế A Nan, a Vietnamese king from the region of Champa 
Junro Anan (阿南準郎), Japanese baseball player
Kenji Anan (阿南健治), Japanese actor
Pokklaw Anan, Thai footballer 

Japanese-language surnames